Pasma Nchouapouognigni (born 21 December 1992) is a Cameroonian handball player for DSGP and the Cameroonian national team.

She represented Cameroon at the 2017 World Women's Handball Championship in Germany.

References

1992 births
Living people
Cameroonian female handball players
Expatriate handball players
Cameroonian expatriates in the Republic of the Congo
20th-century Cameroonian women
21st-century Cameroonian women